Cantharellus cibarius (Latin: cantharellus, "chanterelle"; cibarius, "culinary") is a species of golden chanterelle mushroom in the genus Cantharellus. It is also known as girolle (or girole). It grows in Europe from Scandinavia to the Mediterranean Basin, mainly in deciduous and coniferous forests.  Due to its characteristic color and shape, it is easy to distinguish from mushrooms with potential toxicity that discourage human consumption. A commonly eaten and favored mushroom, the chanterelle is typically harvested from late summer to late fall in its European distribution.

Chanterelles are used in many culinary dishes, and can be preserved by either drying or freezing. An oven should not be used when drying it because can result in the mushroom becoming bitter.

Taxonomy
At one time, all yellow or golden chanterelles in North America had been classified as Cantharellus cibarius. Using DNA analysis, they have since been shown to be a group of related species known as the Cantharellus cibarius group or species complex, with C. cibarius sensu stricto restricted to Europe. In 1997, the Pacific golden chanterelle (C. formosus) and C. cibarius var. roseocanus were identified, followed by C. cascadensis in 2003 and C. californicus in 2008.

Description
The mushroom is easy to detect and recognize in nature. The color varies from yellow to dark yellow. Red spots will appear on the cap of the mushroom if it is damaged. Chanterelle mushrooms have a faint aroma and flavour of apricots.

Care should be taken not to confuse this species with the dangerously poisonous Omphalotus illudens.

References

External links

cibarius
Edible fungi
Fungi in cultivation
Fungi of Europe
Fungi described in 1821